Mikhalevo is a rural locality (a village) in Golovinskoye Rural Settlement, Sudogodsky District, Vladimir Oblast, Russia. The population was 3 as of 2010.

Geography 
It is located 2 km north from Golovino, 30 km west from Sudogda.

References 

Rural localities in Sudogodsky District